WWE Libraries Inc. (branded as WWE Legacy Department) is a WWE-owned subsidiary that consists of  the largest collection of professional wrestling videos and copyrights in the world. It comprises not only past and current works by WWE (formerly the Capitol Wrestling Corporation, World Wide Wrestling Federation, World Wrestling Federation, and World Wrestling Entertainment) but also the works of now defunct professional wrestling promotions dating back to the 1940s. As of 2014, the library stands at 150,000 hours of content including weekly television shows, pay-per-views, and recorded house shows. The collection represents a very significant portion of the visual history of modern professional wrestling in the United States and Canada. WWE has made their classic holdings available through numerous home-video releases, the WWE Vintage television program, and the WWE Network.

The dates listed below for purchased organizations and libraries represent the duration of that company, and may not necessarily represent the extent of historical video owned.

Classic WWE holdings 
The library includes all past and present WWE tapes dating back to the 1950s, including all previous forms of the company.

Although not wrestling content, the library's holdings also include footage from various documentaries, reality shows, and fictional works produced for home video, the WWE Network and other broadcasters, and any motion pictures produced by WWE Studios. The footage saved from WWE's days as the Capitol Wrestling Corporation is also among the rare surviving footage of broadcasts from the DuMont Television Network, as most of their footage was destroyed in the mid-1970s.

Non-WWE purchases 
For years, WWE has engaged in a campaign of purchasing libraries of defunct wrestling promotions. The first significant purchase took place in 2001 when the company bought the complete historical archives of their former competitor World Championship Wrestling. The purchase of the Extreme Championship Wrestling intellectual unit and library during its bankruptcy proceedings in 2003 gave the company the majority of all national professional wrestling content available at the time.

On 13 August 2020, WWE announced that shows from the libraries of Evolve Wrestling, Westside Xtreme Wrestling, Progress Wrestling, and Insane Championship Wrestling, featuring matches from many current superstars, will begin airing on the WWE Network.

American Wrestling Association (1957–1991)
Georgia Championship Wrestling (1944–1985)
Eastern/Extreme Championship Wrestling (ECW) (1992–2001) 
World Wrestling Alliance (1998)
Power Pro Wrestling (1998–2000)
International Wrestling Association (1999–2001)
Memphis Championship Wrestling (2000–2001)
Ohio Valley Wrestling (1998–2008)
Deep South Wrestling (2005–2007) 
Florida Championship Wrestling (2007–2012)
Heartland Wrestling Association (2001–2003)
Smoky Mountain Wrestling (1992–1995)
Stampede Wrestling (1948–1989)
Global Wrestling Federation (1991–1994, shared with ESPN)
World Championship Wrestling (WCW) (1988–2001)
Jim Crockett Promotions (1931–1988) which by the end included
Eastern States Championship Wrestling (1945–1973)
Mid-Atlantic Championship Wrestling (1973–1988)
Central States Wrestling (c. early 1950s–1986)
Championship Wrestling from Florida (1961–1987)
Championship Wrestling from Georgia (1984–1985)
NWA Tri-State/Mid-South Wrestling/UWF (1950s–1987)
Heartland Wrestling Association (1990s)
World Class Championship Wrestling (1966–1988)
Maple Leaf Wrestling (1930–1995)
World Wrestling Council (1973–2018)
Evolve Wrestling (2010–2020)
Dragon Gate USA (2009–2015)
Former WWE developmental territory
Angelo and Mario Savoldi, the former owners of International World Class Championship Wrestling, own all post-1988 footage of WCCW and its successor promotions.
While the promotion was bought by JCP, the video library was not part of the purchase. WWE bought the video library from the private owner.
While WWE owns the library, Bret Hart owns the rights to the footage of his matches.

National Wrestling Alliance 
Throughout its history, WWE has had a long relationship with the National Wrestling Alliance (NWA).  For many decades, until the mid-1980s, the NWA acted as a governing body of the many regional wrestling promotions, and membership allowed for decreased regional competition and the shared use of big-name stars for local events. WWE (as Capitol Wrestling) was a member of the NWA between 1953 and 1963, and again (as the WWWF) between 1971 and 1983. In 1998, WWE (as the WWF) hosted NWA matches on its programming.

Jim Crockett Promotions was an NWA member for its entire existence and by the end of the promotion's run was, more or less, the NWA, thanks to its control of the largest regional NWA promotions. This was exemplified by the presence of all major NWA titles in World Championship Wrestling when Crockett Promotions morphed into WCW in the 1980s. WCW's relationship with the NWA was even more convoluted than WWE's until WCW left the NWA in 1993.

As a result of WWE's former membership in the NWA, through its ownership of WCW and its predecessor libraries, and through its ownership of Extreme Championship Wrestling (which was an NWA member until it suddenly severed ties in 1994) and other smaller regional promotions, WWE owns a vast amount of NWA footage, making up the majority of significant NWA matches from the 1970s, 1980s, and early 1990s.

Condition
Although professional wrestling has been on television throughout the medium's existence, not all broadcasts were recorded, nor necessarily saved, and most promotions did not have a regular television presence until the 1970s. Most broadcasts were taped over, so very little footage exists from pre-1970s promotions. This includes the WWE precursor Capitol Wrestling Corporation. The historical availability of individual, non-televised matches is also incomplete, as likely only the most significant bouts were recorded for posterity, and can be lost to time.

Several factors have adversely affected the quality of some surviving tapes. Upon taking control of the World Championship Wrestling library, it was noted that the tapes were unlabeled and not categorized. The condition of some WCW tapes is such that WWE could not air them on WWE Classics on Demand, or on the WWE Network.

Editing 
WWE owns the unedited master tapes for all content in the library. However, due to a lawsuit over the "WWF" initials brought on by the World Wide Fund for Nature (WWF), from April 2002 until June 2012, they were not allowed to use the letters WWF or the "scratch" logo used between December 15, 1997, and April 29, 2002 (the pre-"scratch" logo was not covered under this lawsuit, with a variation of this being used in the November 15, 2010 WWE Raw Old School edition). As a result, any instances of someone saying "WWF" (though not World Wrestling Federation) were edited and shots of the "scratch" logo were either removed or blurred on re-airings or video releases released during that time frame, except for the UK exclusive WWE Tagged Classics DVD range. In late July 2012, WWE reached a settlement with the WWF which once again allows them to use the "WWF" initials and scratch logo on archive footage. Unedited footage first appeared on  Raw 1000 and since then has appeared in full-length matches posted to the WWE website and home video releases. In exchange, WWE is no longer permitted to use the WWF initials or logo in any new, original footage, with any old-school logos for retro-themed programming now using the original WWF logo, but modified without the F.

Music rights issues are also reasons for occasional editing by WWE of its library when airing or releasing videos. While most wrestlers' entrance themes are done in-house (notably by composer Jim Johnston), those whose music is not owned by WWE are often dubbed over with cheaper alternatives rather than providing the original audio, to save WWE paying licensing fees to the writers/performers of the original songs. Videos heavily affected in particular by these cost-cutting decisions are those featuring footage from Extreme Championship Wrestling (ECW), which was famous for using recordings by mainstream music acts such as Metallica, AC/DC, and Dr. Dre for their wrestlers' entrances, although AC/DC and Metallica have provided music for WWE pay-per-view events as well. Exceptions to non-Johnston composed themes that WWE leaves in its archives are either songs that are in the public domain, such as the "Dawn" section of Also sprach Zarathustra used by Ric Flair and Pomp and Circumstance, which was used by Gorgeous George and later Randy Savage; or songs that the WWE acquired from its purchase of WCW, most notably the entrance music for Booker T. Additionally, wrestlers who worked for WWE but whose entrance music in other promotions may be owned by an outside company have had their songs in those promotions replaced by their WWE counterparts, such as Chris Jericho's WCW theme being replaced by his WWE theme.

Due to a 1991 lawsuit, matches featuring Jesse Ventura on commentary were dubbed over for subsequent home video releases.  However, matches featuring Ventura commentating are shown with unaltered audio on the WWE Network.

Since 2007, WWE has edited footage featuring Chris Benoit from repeat broadcasts, due to Benoit's murder-suicide. WWE has released some footage of Benoit from its library as well as WCW and ECW in the years since, but all of these have been group shots not focused on Benoit (most notably the 2004 Royal Rumble). Benoit's wife Nancy Benoit, who performed in a manager role in WCW under the stage name Woman, was also initially removed, but footage of her was later re-added. All archive footage of Chris Benoit has been available uncut on the WWE Network since its launch in 2014.

When WWE Network programming began being moved to Peacock in the United States in 2021, WWE and NBCUniversal began editing controversial content from WWE's past in order to meet NBCU's standards and practices; this also applied to the standalone WWE Network feed that remained overseas.

See also
History of WWE
WWE Home Video

Notes

References

Notes 

Film archives in the United States
WWE
WWE Home Video
Television archives in the United States